Stanley Krippner (born October 4, 1932) is an American psychologist and parapsychologist. He received a B.S. degree from the University of Wisconsin–Madison in 1954 and M.A. (1957) and Ph.D. (1961) degrees from Northwestern University.

From 1972 to 2019, he was an executive faculty member and the Alan Watts Professor of Psychology at Saybrook University in Oakland, California. Formerly, Krippner was director of the Kent State University Child Study Center (1961-1964) and director of the Maimonides Medical Center Dream Research Laboratory (of Brooklyn, New York; 1964-1972).

Biography

Krippner has written extensively on altered states of consciousness, dream telepathy, hypnosis, shamanism, dissociation, and parapsychological subjects. Krippner was an early leader in Division 32 of the American Psychological Association (APA), the division concerned with humanistic psychology, serving as President of the division from 1980–1981. He also served as president of division 30, the Society for Psychological Hypnosis, and is a Fellow of four APA divisions. Krippner has conducted experiments with Montague Ullman into dream telepathy at the Maimonides Medical Center. In 2002, Krippner won the APA Award for Distinguished Contributions to the International Advancement of Psychology.

Reception

Dream telepathy

In 1993, Krippner published the results of a number of dream telepathy experiments he conducted along with other researchers at Maimonides Medical Center. The experiments have not been independently replicated. In a review of the research published in American Psychologist, Professor Irwin Child, former head of the Department of Psychology at Yale University, concluded that 'the tendency toward hits rather than misses cannot reasonably be ascribed to chance'. But this favorable commentary has been criticized by a number of reviews and respondents, who argued that Krippner's work like most parapsychology severely lacked in rigor and instituting proper controls against bias.

In 1985, psychologist C. E. M. Hansel criticized the picture target experiments that were conducted by Krippner and Ullman. According to Hansel, there were weaknesses in the design of the experiments in the way in which the agent became aware of their target picture. Only the agent should have known the target and no other person until the judging of targets had been completed, however, an experimenter was with the agent when the target envelope was opened. Hansel also wrote there had been poor controls in the experiment as the main experimenter could communicate with the subject. In 2002, Krippner denied Hansel's accusations claiming the agent did not communicate with the experimenter.

An attempt to replicate the experiments that used picture targets was carried out by Edward Belvedere and David Foulkes. The finding was that neither the subject nor the judges matched the targets with dreams above chance level. Results from other experiments by Belvedere and Foulkes were also negative.

In 2003, Simon Sherwood and Chris Roe wrote a review that claimed support for dream telepathy at Maimonides. However, James Alcock noted that their review was based on "extreme messiness" of data. Alcock concluded the dream telepathy experiments at Maimonides have failed to provide evidence for telepathy and "lack of replication is rampant."

Psychics

Krippner has drawn criticism for endorsing the feats of a Russian psychic Nina Kulagina. Science writer Martin Gardner found it surprising that Krippner took interest in Kulagina despite knowing that she was a "charlatan" who was caught on two occasions using tricks to move objects. Krippner took issue with this statement believing it to be an attack on himself and wrote there was "no suggestion of trickery." However, psychologists Jerome Kravitz and Walter Hillabrant have noted that she was "caught cheating more than once by Soviet Establishment scientists." Gardner later commenting on Kulagina stated that she utilized invisible threads to move objects.

Krippner has contributed to and co-edited Future Science: Life Energies and the Physics of Paranormal Phenomena (1977). It included an essay from the parapsychologist Julius Weinberger, who claimed to have communicated with the dead by using a Venus flytrap as the medium. Philosopher Paul Kurtz criticized the book for endorsing pseudoscience.

Magician and noted skeptic Henry Gordon has written:

A reading of Krippner's book, Human Possibilities, published by Doubleday, convinced me that there is a man sincere in his beliefs in the paranormal and bending over backward to be fair and open minded but incredibly naive. In his book he endorses the feats of several psychics who have already been exposed as frauds.

Krippner co-edited and contributed to Debating Psychic Experience (2010). He also co-edited and contributed to Varieties of Anomalous Experience (2013) which has received positive reviews.

Notes

External links

Living people
1932 births
American parapsychologists
American consciousness researchers and theorists
Humanistic psychology
Kent State University faculty
Northwestern University School of Education and Social Policy alumni
American psychology writers
American male non-fiction writers
People from Edgerton, Wisconsin
Writers from Wisconsin